Tudi (also Romanized as Tūdī and Ţūdī) is a village in Sangan Rural District, in the Central District of Khash County, Sistan and Baluchestan Province, Iran. At the 2006 census, its population was 70, in 20 families.

References 

Populated places in Khash County